CVI may refer to:

Ancient history & culture 
106 in Roman numerals
Cvi, a verbal formation in classical Sanskrit connected with the Devi and Vrkis feminines

Geography 
Cape Verde Islands, UNDP code

Medical conditions 
Cerebrovascular insult, a medical condition more commonly known as stroke
Chronic venous insufficiency, a medical condition affecting veins of the leg
Cortical visual impairment, a form of brain-related visual impairment

Business, industry & technology 
 Chemical vapor infiltration, a chemical vapor deposition type process used for ceramic matrix composites
 Colloid vibration current, an electroacoustic phenomenon in colloids
 Commercial Vehicle Inspection, enforcement of safety laws regarding commercial vehicles
 Component video input, a video connection mode
 Composite video interface, a video signal format
 Corporate visual identity
 The C.V.I., an automobile produced in Michigan in 1907–1908
 LabWindows/CVI, an event-driven, ANSI C programming environment

Fiction / Literature 
Cyber-Viral Implant, a fictional technology in the television series Earth: Final Conflict

Sports 
 Concours de Voltige International

See also 
C6 (disambiguation), including a list of topics named C.VI, etc.